The 1968 Grantland Rice Bowl was an NCAA College Division game following the 1968 season, between the Akron Zips and the Louisiana Tech Bulldogs. This was the last 
time that the Grantland Rice Bowl was played in Murfreesboro, Tennessee.

Notable participants
Louisiana Tech quarterback Terry Bradshaw was selected first in the 1970 NFL Draft by the Pittsburgh Steelers. His teammates Larry Brewer and Tommy Spinks were also drafted. Bradshaw and Spinks are inductees of their university's athletic hall of fame, as is head coach Maxie Lambright. Bradshaw is an inductee of both the College Football Hall of Fame and the Pro Football Hall of Fame.

The Akron squad has been designated a Team of Distinction by their university's sports hall of fame; head coach Gordon K. Larson was inducted to the hall in 1975, running back John "Jack" Beidleman was inducted in 1980, and quarterback Don Zwisler was inducted in 1981.

Scoring summary

Statistics

References

Further reading

External links
 @LATechFB First Bowl Game: 1968 Grantland Rice 

Grantland Rice Bowl
Grantland Rice Bowl
Akron Zips football bowl games
Louisiana Tech Bulldogs football bowl games
Murfreesboro, Tennessee
December 1968 sports events in the United States
Grantland Rice